The Complete Guide to Insufficiency is the debut album by David Thomas Broughton, released in 2005. The entire album was recorded in a single continuous take at a church in Leeds - the church bells can be heard during the record. It was originally released by small indie label Birdwar in the UK before being licensed by Plug Research for US release. The title is a play on the name of John Seymour's book The Complete Guide to Self-Sufficiency.

Track listing
"Ambiguity" – 6:35
"Execution" – 8:21
"Unmarked Grave" – 8:46
"Walking Over You" – 6:17
"Ever Rotating Sky" – 9:07

All songs by David Thomas Broughton

References

2005 debut albums
David Thomas Broughton albums